William S. Koski is an American lawyer who is currently the Eric and Nancy Wright Professor of Clinical Education, Professor of Law, Stanford Law School at Stanford Law School.

Education
BBA with highest distinction University of Michigan 1990
JD cum laude University of Michigan Law School 1993
PhD Stanford University School of Education 2003

References

Stanford Law School faculty
American lawyers
Stanford Graduate School of Education alumni
University of Michigan Law School alumni
Year of birth missing (living people)
Living people
Ross School of Business alumni